Sommai Niyompon  (born ) is a retired Thai female volleyball player, who played as a wing spiker.

She was part of the Thailand women's national volleyball team at the 2002 FIVB Volleyball Women's World Championship in Germany. 
On club level she played with Thai-Denmark Nongrua.

Clubs
  Pepsi Bangkok (2002)
  SCG Khonkaen (2011-2012)
  Thai-Denmark Nongrua (2016–2017)

References

1984 births
Living people
Sommai Niyompon
Place of birth missing (living people)
Volleyball players at the 2002 Asian Games
Sommai Niyompon
Sommai Niyompon
Sommai Niyompon